Tetratomidae is a small family  of beetles sometimes called polypore fungus beetles. The family consists of several genera, most of which used to be in the family Melandryidae. Tetratomidae can be found worldwide.

Their food consists of fruiting bodies of hymenomycete fungi.

Genera
These 12 genera belong to the family Tetratomidae:

 Cyanopenthe 
 Eustrophopsis 
 Eustrophus 
 Hallomenus 
 Holostrophus 
 Mycetoma 
 Penthe 
 Pisenus 
 Pseudoholostrophus 
 Synstrophus 
 Tetratoma 
 Triphyllia

Fossil genera 
Subfamily Eustrophinae
 Tribe Eustrophini
 †Allostrophus  (Cenomanian Burmese amber, Myanmar)
 †Thescelostrophus  (Burmese amber)
 Tribe Holostrophini
 †Synchrotronia  (Cenomanian Charentese amber, France) 
 Tribe incertae sedis
 †Cretosynstrophus  (Burmese amber)
Subfamily Hallomeninae
 †Pseudohallomenus  (Santonian, Taimyr amber, Russia)

References

Tenebrionoidea
Beetle families